A mnemonic verse listing the monarchs ruling in England since William the Conqueror was traditionally used by British schoolchildren in the era when rote learning formed a major part of the curriculum.

The verse
Various versions of the verse exist. One version is:
Willie Willie Harry Stee
Harry Dick John Harry three;
One two three Neds, Richard two
Harrys four five six ... then who?
Edwards four five, Dick the bad,
Harrys (twain),VII VIII Ned six (the lad);
Mary, Bessie, James you ken,
Then Charlie, Charlie, James again...
Will and Mary, Anna Gloria,
Georges four,I II III IV Will four, Victoria;
Edward seven next, and then
Came George the fifth in nineteen ten;
Ned the eighth soon abdicated
Then George six was coronated;
After which Elizabeth
And that's all folks until her death.

One suggested 2022 update for the last couplet is:
Then Number Two, Elizabeth...
Charles Three (and now I'm out of breath...!) 

A slightly shorter version that is sometimes used is:
Willie, Willie, Harry, Stee,
Harry, Dick, John, Harry three;
One two three Neds, Richard two,
Harrys four five six, ... then who?
Edwards four five, Dick the bad,
Harrys (twain),VII VIII Ned six (the lad);
Mary, Bessie, James you ken,
Then Charlie, Charlie, James again;
Will and Mary, Anna Gloria,
Georges four,I II III IV Will four, Victoria;
Edward seven, George and Ted,
George the sixth, now Liz instead. 

These lists omit several disputed monarchs (including Empress Matilda, Henry the Young King, Louis VIII of France, Philip II of Spain and Lady Jane Grey), and do not mention the Commonwealth of England.

Published versions
Alan Bennett quotes and adapts the verse in his 1968 play Forty Years On. The scene with the verse is set during the Second World War, before the accession of Elizabeth II, and Bennett's version stops at Victoria.

The 1991 film King Ralph includes a brief section of the verse.

The Monarchs' Song from the TV series Horrible Histories lists the monarchs of England and has some phrases in common with the traditional verse.

Mnemonic for royal houses
A different mnemonic is used to remember the sequence of English and British royal houses or dynasties.
No Plan Like Yours To Study History Wisely
The initial letters of which give the royal houses:
Norman, Plantagenet, Lancaster, York, Tudor, Stuart, Hanover, Windsor
This list of royal houses differs from the views of many historians. For example, Lancaster and York are considered cadet branches of the House of Plantagenet, and the House of Saxe-Coburg-Gotha was renamed as Windsor in 1917.

See also
 List of English monarchs
 List of British monarchs

References

English monarchs
British monarchs
British monarchy
Monarchs
Britain
English monarchy